Civilización (Civilization) is the ninth and last album by Argentine rock band Los Piojos, released in 2007.

Track listing 
 Manjar  [Delicacy]
 Pacífico  [Pacific]
 Civilización  [Civilization]
 Bicho de ciudad  [City bug]
 Pollo viejo  [Old chicken]
 Cruces y flores  [Crosses and flowers]
 Difícil  [Difficult]
 Un buen día  [A good day]
 Basta de penas  [No more sorrows]
 Unbekannt  [Unbekannt]
 Salitral  [Saltpetrous]
 Hoy es hoy  [Today is today]
 Buenos días, Palomar  [Good morning Palomar]

External links 
 Civilización 

2007 albums